André Haudry, seigneur de Soucy (hamlet of Fontenay-lès-Briis), Fontenay, Janvry, de Segrez and other places (7 November 1688 – 30 December 1769) was an 18th-century French fermier général. Born in Corbeil-Essonnes, he died in his Paris home in 1769 and was buried in the chapel of his château de Soucy on 1 January 1770. His body was moved to the communal cemetery in Fontenay-lès-Briis by decision of its town council in 1857.

References

1688 births
1769 deaths
Fermiers généraux